Sueño de amor, is a Mexican telenovela produced by José Rendón for Televisa in 1993. It is based on the radionovela La gata, original of Inés Rodena.

Omar Fierro and Angélica Rivera star as the main protagonists, while Cynthia Klitbo and Fernando Luján tar as the main antagonists.

Cast 
 Angélica Rivera as Isabel González Hernández / Erika de la Cruz
 Omar Fierro as Antonio Montenegro
 Sergio Basañez as Mauricio Montenegro
 Fernando Luján as Ernesto Montenegro
 Cynthia Klitbo as Ana Luisa Montenegro
 Guillermo Zarur as Nacho
 Malena Doria as Aurelia Reyes de Hernández
 Tony Carbajal as Anselmo Hernández
 Tony Bravo as Carlo Lombardo
 Héctor Suárez Gomis as Poncho
 María Fernanda García as Ligia Escalante
 Meche Barba as Teresa
 Rosángela Balbó as Marcela
 Bruno Bichir as Franco Giordano
 Eugenio Cobo as Federico
 Laura Martí as Nora "La Chikis"
 Rafael Banquells as Manuel
 Fidel Garriga as Adrián
 María Prado as María
 Francisco Avendaño as Armando
 Isabella Tena

References

External links 

1993 telenovelas
1993 Mexican television series debuts
1993 Mexican television series endings
Mexican telenovelas
Televisa telenovelas
Spanish-language telenovelas